Colchester is a census-designated place (CDP) comprising the primary village and adjacent residential land in the town of Colchester, New London County, Connecticut, United States. It is in the east-central part of the town, with the Connecticut Route 2 expressway running through the south side of the community. As of the 2010 census, the CDP had a population of 4,781, out of 16,068 in the entire town of Colchester.

 at the center of the village comprise the Colchester Village Historic District, listed on the National Register of Historic Places in 1994.

References 

Census-designated places in New London County, Connecticut
Census-designated places in Connecticut